Lepidochrysops violetta, the violet blue, is a butterfly in the family Lycaenidae. It is found in Zimbabwe (the Nyanga massif). The habitat consists of the lower slopes of hills in grassland.

Adults have been recorded on wing in October and early November.

References

Butterflies described in 1945
Lepidochrysops
Endemic fauna of Zimbabwe
Butterflies of Africa
Taxa named by Elliot Pinhey